Shikoku Broadcasting (Rōmaji: Shikoku Hōsō) is a radio and TV station based in Tokushima, Japan. It is affiliated to the Nippon News Network and Nippon Television Network System for TV and JRN/NRN for radio.

Despite holding a local monopoly in commercial television to the prefecture, commercial television stations from Kansai region are easily available.

History
After the establishment of the "Three Radio Laws" (Radio Law, Broadcasting Law, and Radio Supervisory Committee Establishment Law) in 1950, Japan established a system where public broadcasting (NHK) and commercial broadcasting coexisted.

April 7, 1952: Shikoku Broadcasting is established.
July 1, 1952: JR (as in JOJR) commences radio transmissions.
April 1, 1959: Television transmissions commence.
April 5, 1971: JR Television begins their morning show, Good Morning Tokushima (おはようとくしま).
April 1982: The abbreviation is changed to JRT.
December 1984: JRT moves to their current headquarters in Nakatokushima.
July 1988: Bi-lingual TV broadcasts for certain shows commence.
February 6, 2006: Digital terrestrial tests commence.
October 1, 2006: Regular digital terrestrial broadcasts commence.
March 31, 2011: Good Morning Tokushima is cancelled.
July 24, 2011: Analog terrestrial broadcasts conclude.
April 1, 2015: JRT joins the radiko project.

Stations

Radio:

Tokushima master station:
Calls: JOJR
Frequency: 1269 kHz
Output: 5 kW

Ikeda station:
Calls: (was JOJO)
Frequency: 1269 kHz
Output: 1 kW

Mugi station:
Frequency: 1269 kHz
Output: 100 W

Hiwasa station:
Frequency: 1269 kHz
Output: 100 W

Television:

Tokushima master station:
Calls: JOJR-DTV
Frequency: 581.142857 MHz
Output: 1 kW
ERP: 6.5 kW

Links
Official site

Television stations in Japan
Radio in Japan
Nippon News Network
Television channels and stations established in 1959